Ardnave Point (Scottish Gaelic, Àird an Naoimh) is a coastal promontory on the northwest of Islay, a Scottish island. This landform has a rocky northern shore and extensive dunes on the upland areas of the point.

See also
 Loch Gruinart

Line notes

References
 Martin Li. 2005. Adventure Guide to Scotland, 592 pages

External links

Landforms of Islay